"The Matador Song", which dates from 1930, is the school song of the Texas Tech University Red Raiders.

History
The song was created as part of a contest sponsored by the school newspaper, then known as The Toreador. R.C. Marshall, the editor of the 1931 La Ventana was chosen as the winner and given a $25 prize. In the next year, Goin' Band Director Harry LeMaire rewrote the music to the song. Aside from that, it has remained unchanged since its creation. Despite Texas Tech adopting the Red Raider as its mascot in 1936, the song continues to refer to the original Matador mascot.

Lyrics

References

Texas Tech University
Texas Tech Red Raiders
American college songs
College fight songs in the United States
Big 12 Conference fight songs
Songs about Texas
1930 songs